Anadasmus plebicola is a moth in the family Depressariidae. It was described by Edward Meyrick in 1918. It is found in French Guiana and Guyana.

The wingspan is 26–28 mm. The forewings are light greyish-ochreous, very faintly pinkish-tinged. The plical and second discal stigmata are small and blackish-grey and there is a line of indistinct cloudy grey dots from the costa at three-fourths to the dorsum at four-fifths, curved outwards from one-third to three-fourths of its length. A marginal series of blackish dots is found around the apex and termen. The hindwings are grey.

References

Moths described in 1918
Anadasmus
Moths of South America